Astia Walker-Eastwood (born 4 April 1975 in Trelawny Parish) is a retired Jamaican athlete who competed mostly in the sprinting and hurdling events. She represented her country in the 200 metres at the 2000 Summer Olympics reaching the second round. Most of her successes came in the 4 × 100 metres relay. Walker-Eastwood ran track collegiately Riverside Community College and Louisiana State University. She was inducted into the Riverside Community College Sports Hall of Fame in 2015.

Competition record

Personal bests
Outdoor
100 metres – 11.28 (+0.2 m/s) (Kingston 2001)
200 metres – 22.79 (+0.7 m/s) (Linz 2000)
100 metres hurdles – 12.82 (+0.8 m/s) (Leverkusen 2000)
Indoor
60 metres – 7.41 (Baton Rouge 1999)
200 metres – 23.15 (Baton Rouge 1998)
60 metres hurdles – 8.07 (Chemnitz 2003)

References

1975 births
Living people
Jamaican female sprinters
Jamaican female hurdlers
Olympic athletes of Jamaica
Athletes (track and field) at the 2000 Summer Olympics
Athletes (track and field) at the 2002 Commonwealth Games
LSU Lady Tigers track and field athletes
People from Trelawny Parish
Commonwealth Games medallists in athletics
Commonwealth Games silver medallists for Jamaica
Goodwill Games medalists in athletics
Competitors at the 2001 Goodwill Games
Medallists at the 2002 Commonwealth Games